Chyton, according to Ephorus, was a new city founded in Epirus during the 4th century BC. The city was established by Ionians from Klazomenai.

Its site is unlocated.

References

See also
List of cities in ancient Epirus

Populated places established in the 4th century BC
Cities in ancient Epirus
Ionian colonies
Populated places in ancient Epirus
Lost ancient cities and towns
Former populated places in Greece